Sirintra Niyakorn ( b. 10 March 1965) is a famous Thai Luk thung singer.

Early life
Sirintra Niyakorn was born in Bang Khen District, Bangkok. She is the daughter of Samran Niyakorn and Thongluan Niyakorn. She has a third degree from Ramkhamhaeng University.

Career 
Sirintra Niyakorn debuted on stage entertainers in 1981. She was a winner of a Wathinee music centre singing contest. In 1984, she was a singer under the Azona label. Her popular songs include: Rue Wa Khao Lok, Ja Kor Koe Rib Kor, Tha Paeng Roe and Yak Fang Sam.

Personal life
Since 2014, Sirintra Niyakorn has supported the People's Democratic Reform Committee.

She is an event planner for entertainers, a host of Blue Sky Channel and DJ for F.M. 95.

Discography

Albums
Rue wa Khao Lok (รู้ว่าเขาหลอก)
Ja Kor Koe Rib Kor (จะขอก็รีบขอ)
Tha Paeng Roe (ทาแป้งรอ)
Yak Fang Sam (อยากฟังซ้ำ)
Nue Kham Saban (เหนือคำสาบาน)
Khoy Phee (คอยพี่)

References

1965 births
Living people
Sirintra Niyakorn
Sirintra Niyakorn